The Cappella Colleoni (Italian: "Colleoni Chapel") is a chapel and mausoleum attached to the Basilica of St. Mary Major in the northern Italian city of Bergamo.

Dedicated to the saints Bartholomew, Mark and John the Baptist, it was built between 1472 and 1476 as the personal shrine for the condottiere Bartolomeo Colleoni, a member of one of the city's most notable families, and his beloved daughter Medea. The site chosen was that of the church's sacristy, which was demolished by Colleoni's soldiers. Whether or not the demolition was authorized by church administrators remains the subject of scholarly debate among Italian historians.

The design was entrusted to Giovanni Antonio Amadeo, whose plan respected the style of the church, as can be seen from the octagonal tambour of the dome and in the lantern cusp, as well as in the use of polychrome marbles.

Overview
The façade is characterized by the use of inlaying and polychrome marble decoration in white, red and black lozenges. Over the main portal is a rose window, flanked by two medallions portraying Julius Caesar and Trajan.

The upper part of the basement has nine plaques with reliefs of biblical stories, and four bas-reliefs depicting the labors of Hercules. The four pilasters of the windows flanking the portal are surmounted by statues of the Virtues. The upper part of the façade has a loggia in Romanesque style.

The interior includes a square hall and a smaller room housing the high altar. The tomb of Bartolomeo Colleoni (who died on November 2, 1475) is on the wall facing the entrance. It is decorated with reliefs of Episodes from the Life of Christ, statues, heads of lions, and an equestrian statue of the condottiere in gilded wood, finished by German masters from Nuremberg in 1501. The whole complex is surrounded by a triumphal arch.

Amadeo himself executed the funerary monument of Medea Colleoni (died March 6, 1470). Located on the left wall, it has a statue of the Deposition from the Cross in high relief. The tomb was transferred here in 1892 from Basella di Urgnano.

The presbytery has a high altar sculpted by Bartolomeo Manni in 1676, housing statues of the three saints to whom the chapel is dedicated—John, Mark, and Bartholomew—by Pietro Lombardo. The upswept cornice is supported by Solomonic columns. The altar table, to a design by Leopoldo Pollack, is supported by angels carved by Grazioso Rusca.

Notable are the frescoes of the dome, depicting Episodes of the Lives of St. Mark, John the Baptist and Bartholomew, executed by Giambattista Tiepolo in 1732–1733.

Bartolomeo Colleoni's remains
For centuries it was believed that the condottiere's remains had been buried elsewhere, as the sarcophagus appeared empty. On November 21, 1969, however, they were discovered in Colleoni's tomb in a wooden coffin, hidden under a plaster cover.

See also
 History of medieval Arabic and Western European domes
 History of Italian Renaissance domes
 History of early modern period domes

References

Kohl, Jeanette (2004): Fama und Virtus. Bartolomeo Colleonis Grabkapelle. Akademie-Verlag Berlin
https://arthistory.ucr.edu/fama-and-virtus/

External links
Complete description 
Tiepolo's frescoes 

Roman Catholic churches completed in 1476
15th-century Roman Catholic church buildings in Italy
Churches in Bergamo
Roman Catholic chapels in Italy